Kazuyasu (written:  or ) is a masculine Japanese given name. Notable people with the name include:

, Japanese fencer
, Japanese politician

Japanese masculine given names